Cathi Unsworth is an English writer and journalist.  After working for Melody Maker and Bizarre, she began writing novels, with The Not Knowing in 2005 and The Singer in 2007, on Serpent's Tail.  She also edited its London Noir anthology in 2006.

Her writing is heavily influenced by the late Derek Raymond .

She lives in London, where she still works as a journalist, including for Dazed & Confused.

Works

Novels
The Not Knowing (2005)
The Singer (2007)
Bad Penny Blues (2009)
Weirdo (2012)
Without the Moon (2015)
That Old Black Magic (2018)

Short story collections
London Noir: Capital Crime Fiction (2006) (as editor)

Other
Man of Violence An essay for the sleeve notes for the DVD release from the BFI Flipside range.
That Kind of Girl The sleeve notes for the DVD release from the BFI Flipside range.

External links
 Cathi Unsworth's personal website
 Serpent's Tail page
 3:AM interview

English women journalists
English women novelists
Living people
Year of birth missing (living people)
English short story writers
British women short story writers
21st-century English women writers
21st-century British short story writers
English women non-fiction writers